The Order of Physicians  is the public entity that serves as the regulatory and licensing body for medical practitioners in Portugal. As a professional order, it is responsible for licensing physicians to practice medicine, for the deontological norms that regulate the medical profession, it has an autonomous disciplinary regime, and represents the profession vis-à-vis the public authorities.

It was first established in 1898, as the Association of Portuguese Physicians, the first of its kind in the country. It was incorporated as the Order of Physicians by Decree-Law No. 29 171 of 24 November 1938, and its first Chairman (with the distinctive title of Bastonário; literally, Mace-Bearer) was Elísio de Azevedo e Moura (1877–1977). The current Mace-Bearer is Miguel Guimarães, elected in 2017.

The Order of Physicians is also responsible for the technical standards of postgraduate medical training and attributes clinicians with the degree of specialist.

References

1938 establishments in Portugal
Medical associations
Medical and health organisations based in Portugal
Medical and health regulators
Medical regulation
Professional associations based in Portugal
Regulation in Portugal